Bo Teacher's College is a three year college located in Bo, the second largest city of Sierra Leone.
The college trains prospective teachers for primary and junior secondary school levels (form 1-3). after successfully completing the programme, candidates qualify for the Teachers Certificate (TC) and the Higher Teachers Certificate (HTC).  The college offers programmes in several majors, including English studies, social studies, environmental science, agriculture and Mathematics education.

Current programmes
 School of Community Health Services
 School of Social Sciences
 School of Agriculture
 School of Environmental Sciences
 School of Technology
 school of business management
 school of social studies

External links
https://web.archive.org/web/20101121212647/http://dogstreetjournal.com/story/1767

Universities and colleges in Sierra Leone
Bo, Sierra Leone